Prinz is the lava-flooded remains of a lunar impact crater on the Oceanus Procellarum. It was named after German-Belgian astronomer . The formation lies to the southwest of the prominent crater Aristarchus. To the north-northeast is the flooded crater Krieger.

The rim of Prinz is the most intact in its northeastern half, while a large gap exists in the southern end of the crater wall. The rim climbs to a maximum height of 1.0 km above the base. It is attached along the eastern rim by a low ridge that is part of the foothills of the small Montes Harbinger range to the northeast. The region of the mare about Prinz is marked by rays and secondary craters from Aristarchus.

Rimae Prinz
Just to the north of Prinz is a system of rilles designated the Rimae Prinz. These are sinuous in nature and extend for up to 80 kilometers. The tiny crater Vera is only a couple of kilometers to the north of Prinz's rim, and serves as the origin of one of these rilles. Within the same rille complex is the tiny crater Ivan. The crater Vera was previously identified as Prinz A, and Ivan as Prinz B, before they were assigned names by the IAU.

To the northwest is another distinct rille system designated Rimae Aristarchus.

References

External links
 LTO-39A3 — L&PI topographic map, it does not display the southern part

Impact craters on the Moon